The Biggest Loser a reality TV series
 The Biggest Loser - List of the various The Biggest Loser programs created in different countries and languages
 The Biggest Loser Asia
 The Biggest Loser Asia (season 1)
 The Biggest Loser Asia (season 2)
 The Biggest Winner Arabic version of the reality TV series
 The Biggest Loser (Australian TV series)
 The Biggest Loser (Brunei TV series)
 The Biggest Loser Germany
 Biggest Loser Jeetega India's version of the reality TV series in the Hindi language
 The Biggest Loser (Netherlands TV series)
 The Biggest Loser Pinoy Edition Philippines version of reality TV series
 The Biggest Loser Pinoy Edition (season 1)
 The Biggest Loser Pinoy Edition: Doubles (season 2)
 Marele câștigător Romania's version of reality TV series
 The Biggest Loser South Africa
 The Biggest Loser (UK TV series)
 The Biggest Loser (U.S. TV series)
 The Biggest Loser (season 1)
 The Biggest Loser (season 2)
 The Biggest Loser (season 3)
 The Biggest Loser (season 4)
 The Biggest Loser (season 5)
 The Biggest Loser (season 6)
 The Biggest Loser: Couples 2 - season 7
 The Biggest Loser: Second Chances - season 8
 The Biggest Loser: Couples 3 - season 9
 The Biggest Loser: Pay It Forward - season 10
 The Biggest Loser: Couples 4 - season 11
 The Biggest Loser: Battle of the Ages - season 12
 The Biggest Loser: No Excuses - season 13
 The Biggest Loser: Challenge America - season 14